Park Orchards is a suburb of Melbourne, Victoria, Australia, 23 km north-east of Melbourne's Central Business District, located within the Cities of Manningham and Maroondah local government areas. Park Orchards recorded a population of 3,835 at the 2021 census.

Park Orchards is primarily within the City of Manningham, with a small portion (the southern side of Williams road) located within the City of Maroondah. The suburb is a Green Wedge area and is listed in the Australian Heritage Database.

History

Prior to European colonisation, the Wurundjeri people cared for the land.

In 1902, prominent Victorian orchardist, Tom Petty], purchased  of land north of the Mitcham district and, in an ambitious project, converted it to 80 orchard blocks.

In 1925, South Melbourne timber merchants, Australias Sharp and John Taylor, purchased Petty's land and launched the Park Orchards Country Club Estate. They had the subdivisions designed by Saxil Tuxen and Miller. Tuxen had previously worked with Marion Mahony and Walter Burley Griffin on the Ranelagh Estate in Mt Eliza, which Sharp and Taylor had owned. Park Orchards was designed around a similar "Country Club" development, that had become popular during the 1920s in the USA. The circular street layout is clearly inspired by the Mahony-Griffin style.

The Clubhouse, named "The Chalet" (c.1929), was built in the Spanish Mission style, featuring a blackwood panelled interior, with a ballroom and billiard rooms. The Estate failed to attracts buyers during the 1930s Depression, so Sharp and Taylor cleared much of the land and planted plant pine trees (many which still remain) to provide timber for their business.

In 1944, during World War II, the Australian Army requisitioned The Chalet and the football ground, and set up The School For Eastern Interpreters for Z Special Unit, as well as a training facility for the Australian Special Wireless Group. 400 personnel were stationed there, living in tents on the football ground. The army constructed the first water mains and connected the estate to the electrical grid.

In late 1946, Sharp & Taylor sold the Estate at auction to Edments Ltd, owners of a department store in Melbourne, who reportedly planned to develop part of it into a holiday resort for their staff. They had a 9-hole golf course and cricket ground constructed in the 1950s.

By the late 1950s, the post-war migration boom saw an increase in properties being developed, and most of the blocks had been sold by 1960. The Park Orchards Post Office opened on 1 November 1959, the Primary School opened on 14 March 1961. The final blocks sold in the early 1990s.

In 1965, The Chalet was the location of the first Catholic mass in Park Orchards. From the 1970s, the building was used as restaurant and reception centre, and hosted the wedding of Mick Gatto in 1978. In 1994, the exterior was heritage-listed by the local council.

After The Chalet was sold in 2007, the new owners shut it down and submitted an application to build an aged care facility, which was rejected by the local council. In 2009, the community failed in an attempt to raise $1.5m to purchase the property, with the aim of turning it into a community centre. In 2010, VCAT determined, contrary to the local council ruling, that a planning permit should be issued, albeit with a requirement for reticulated sewerage services to be established. Later in 2010, the Park Orchards Ratepayers Association submitted that both The Chalet and the original Estate area be registered as places of significance by the Heritage Council, but the application was rejected as not meeting the minimum criteria. , The Chalet remained unused and neglected.

Facilities
Park Orchards features a small commercial-zoned area on Park Rd (spread over either side of Hopetoun Rd) with around 20 lots.

There are two local primary schools and a number of private and state secondary schools in close proximity. The two primary schools are Park Orchards Primary School (public), which hosts a monthly Farmers Market, and St. Anne's (private).

Park Orchards Reserve is home to the Basketball Centre, Community House, Tennis Club, Children's Service Centre, Pre-school and Playground.

There are several other public reserves, including a large 41 hectare area of natural bushland known as 'The 100 Acres'.

Horse riding is a popular pastime in the area, with facilities including Helmast Park providing agistment and riding arenas, along with others in nearby Warrandyte.

Sporting clubs
The suburb features the Domeney Reserve & Recreation Centre, which hosts the home games of the Park Orchards Cricket Club and the Park Orchards North Ringwood Parish Sharks Junior Football Club, who play in the Yarra Junior Football League and the Park Orchards Football Club of which long-time local Kevin Sheedy is the number 1 ticket holder, as well as the Yarra Valley Old Boys Football Club.

The suburb is also home to the Park Orchards Tennis Club, the Steelers Basketball Club, the Park Orchards Netball Association and BMX Club.

Domeny Reserve and several roads in the area were used during the 1960s up until 1975 by the Austin 7 Club as part of their Observed Section Trials (Mud Trials).

See also
 City of Doncaster and Templestowe – Park Orchards was previously within this former local government area.

References

Suburbs of Melbourne
Suburbs of the City of Manningham